is a private university in Kawagoe, Saitama and Bunkyo-ku, Tokyo, Japan, established in 1965. The predecessor of the school was founded as Otsuka Branch  of Tokyo Music Conservatory (東京高等音楽学院大塚分教場; Tōkyō Kōtō Ongakuin Otsuka Bunkyōjō—now knows as Kunitachi College of Music) in 1934.

References

External links
  

Educational institutions established in 1938
Private universities and colleges in Japan
Universities and colleges in Saitama Prefecture
Music schools in Japan
1938 establishments in Japan